The year 1636 in music involved some significant events.

Events
January – Johann Erasmus Kindermann is ordered to return to Nuremberg to become second organist of Frauenkirche.
February 23 or 24 – The masque, Triumphs of the Prince d'Amour, by William Davenant, is performed, with music composed by brothers Henry and William Lawes.
Vittoria Aleotti becomes prioress of the Augustinian convent of St. Vito, Ferrara, Italy.
 King Charles I and Queen Henrietta Maria visit Oxford University in August. They are entertained with plays, two of which — William Strode's The Floating Island  and William Cartwright's The Royal Slave — feature music by Henry Lawes.

Publications
 Manuel Cardoso
Second book of masses for four, five, and six voices (Lisbon: Laurenco Craesbeck)
, third book for four, five, and six voices (Lisbon: Laurenco Craesbeck)
 Ignazio Donati
 for two, three, and four voices, Op. 13 (Venice: Alessandro Vincenti)
Second book of motets for solo voice, Op. 14 (Venice: Alessandro Vincenti)
 Eustache Du Caurroy –  for five voices (Paris: Pierre Ballard), published posthumously
 Melchior Franck
, Part 1, for two, three, and four voices with organ bass (Nuremberg: Wolfgang Endter), a collection of motets setting texts from the Book of Isaiah
, Part 2, for one, two, three, and four voices with organ bass and violas (Nuremberg: Wolfgang Endter)
 Filipe de Magalhães –  (Lisbon: Lourenço Craesbeeck)
 Carlo Milanuzzi –  for one, two, and three voices, Op. 19 (Venice: Alessandro Vincenti)
 Heinrich Schütz –  (Small Sacred Concertos), part 1

Opera

Births
April 29 – Esaias Reusner, lutenist and composer (d. 1679)

Deaths

 
Music
17th century in music
Music by year